Wallflowers is a 1928 American drama film directed by James Leo Meehan and written by Dorothy Yost. It is based on the 1927 novel Wallflowers by Temple Bailey. The film stars Hugh Trevor, Mabel Julienne Scott, Charles A. Stevenson, Jean Arthur, Lola Todd and Tempe Pigott. The film was released on February 16, 1928, by Film Booking Offices of America.

Cast       
Hugh Trevor as Rufus
Mabel Julienne Scott as Sherry
Charles A. Stevenson as Mr. Fisk
Jean Arthur as Sandra
Lola Todd as Theodora
Tempe Pigott as Mrs. Claybourne
Crauford Kent as Maulsby
Reginald Simpson as Markaham

References

External links
 

1928 films
1920s English-language films
Silent American drama films
1928 drama films
Film Booking Offices of America films
American silent feature films
American black-and-white films
Films directed by James Leo Meehan
1920s American films